On December 23, 2015, an outbreak of supercell thunderstorms produced tornadoes across northern Mississippi and middle Tennessee, resulting in 13 tornado-related deaths and numerous injuries. Other tornadoes occurred as far north as Indiana and Michigan. Scattered tornado activity continued over the next two days before the outbreak ended. This was the first of two deadly tornado outbreaks to impact the southern United States during December 2015 with the other occurring just a day after this one ended.

Metereological synopsis 

On at December 23, 2015, the Storm Prediction Center discussed the probabilities for severe weather to materialize in the Mississippi Valley, encompassing regions in northern Louisiana, eastern Arkansas, northwestern Mississippi, western Tennessee, the Missouri Bootheel, and extreme southwestern Kentucky. A cold front ejecting from the Texas Panhandle and a warm front coming from the lower Ohio River valley, intersected by a stationary front placed over western Kansas, led to the creation of a triple point over northwestern Missouri. This set up the environment for an atmosphere conductive to severe weather. As the evening progressed, further certainty arose for the possibility for an outbreak, as Convective Available Potential Energy values of around 1,000–2,000 J/kg and effective wind shear were present for the aforementioned areas of the upper Mississippi Valley. Daylight heating in these areas gave way for effective buoyancy in the area, further improving the conditions for supercells and to develop. Given the favorable parameters, the SPC, alongside its Convective outlook, introduced a 15% hatched area for tornadoes, indicating the probability for a few strong tornadoes to occur, as discrete supercell thunderstorms were expected to develop in the area. As such, the SPC issued a PDS tornado watch, the first of multiple tornado watches that day, for northern Louisiana, western Arkansas, northwestern Mississippi, and western Tennessee, highlighting the elevated threat for strong tornadoes in the area. At 2000 UTC, the SPC introduced an increased area for the concern of strong tornadoes, extending the existent area to reach central Tennessee, northwestern Alabama, and central portions of Kentucky. 

The first tornadoes of the day occurred in the Midwest, where an EF1 tornado that touched down in Greenwood, Indiana, where several homes sustained damage. Another tornado caused damage to homes in the Indianapolis suburb of Noblesville. In Illinois, a tornado destroyed multiple outbuildings and downed trees near the town of Sciota. The outbreak also spawned the only known tornado to touch down in Michigan during the month of December, an EF1 that struck the Detroit suburb of Canton, causing considerable damage to vehicles, an industrial park, and a gas station. 

In the area with the greatest risk for tornadoes, multiple supercells developed by noon, soon becoming tornadic. A strong EF2 tornado occurred near Marianna, Arkansas, completely destroying mobile homes, tearing roofs off of frame homes, and damaging cabins in the area. A large EF3 tornado eventually touched down south of Clarksdale, Mississippi, killing two people and severely damaging or destroying about 15 homes in that area. The tornado continued to the northeast, later snapping trees and destroying homes near Marks and Como before dissipating. The same parent supercell produced another tornado further east of Como, a violent EF4 that devastated 6 counties on Mississippi and Tennessee along a  mile long path, killing 9 people. Another destructive EF3 tornado struck the small community of Lutts, Tennessee after dark, destroying multiple homes and a church, and completely leveling the town's post office. Significant tornado activity continued through parts of Mississippi and Tennessee overnight, including an EF2 that killed an elderly couple in their small, unanchored home near Linden, Tennessee. In total, the outbreak produced a total of 13 tornado-related deaths and numerous injuries. Additional scattered tornado activity occurred on the 24th and 25th, including a high-end EF2 that caused heavy damage in the southwestern part of Birmingham, Alabama on Christmas.

Confirmed tornadoes

December 23 event

December 24 event

December 25 event

Holly Springs–Ashland, Mississippi/Selmer, Tennessee

This violent and deadly wedge tornado, which originated from the same cell that produced the Como, Mississippi EF3, touched down in Tate County, Mississippi to the southwest of Holly Springs, initially only causing EF0 tree damage. The tornado rapidly intensified to EF3 strength as it entered Marshall County, obliterating several mobile homes and sweeping away multiple unanchored block foundation homes. A 12-year-old child survived being thrown 300 yards in this area when the mobile home he was in disintegrated. The tornado continued towards Holly Springs, prompting a tornado emergency and leveling a church at high-end EF3 strength. Brick homes in the area had their roofs removed and exterior walls collapsed. The tornado then impacted the south edge of town, causing major damage to a motor sports park, snapping numerous hardwood trees, and destroying homes in the area. The damage that occurred at the Holly Springs Motor Sports Park was particularly severe. Two cinder block restroom facility buildings at this location were reduced to bare slabs with the plumbing fixtures ripped away and missing, and a large  motor home was found upside-down 100 meters away from where it originated, resting on the foundation of a small two-story office building that was completely leveled. A 25-foot section of the top half of the reinforced concrete drag strip wall was broken off with the connecting rebar sheared off, likely as a result of a vehicle being slammed into it during the tornado. A dragster and a company van were both thrown 200 meters, and a metal-framed service garage building was obliterated with anchor bolts ripped out of the foundation and a large engine winch torn from its anchors and blown off of the slab. Ground scouring and debarking of trees occurred on the property as well, and a large section of the aluminum grandstands was blown 500 yards. Two people were killed in Holly Springs, and several others were injured. The tornado continued to intensify as it entered Benton County and passed to the northeast of Ashland, where it reached very high-end EF3 strength as it completely flattened several poorly anchored frame homes, scoured pavement from a road, mangled vehicles beyond recognition, and killed multiple people. An unanchored home in this area was obliterated and swept away along with much of its block foundation, leaving little trace behind. Trees in the area were debarked, a metal warehouse building was damaged, and a brick church had its roof torn off as well.

Continuing to the northeast, the tornado reached EF4 strength near the rural community of Canaan, where trees were debarked and a large home was completely leveled and mostly swept away, leaving much of the foundation slab bare. Two other homes in this area were heavily damaged at EF2 strength. The tornado continued into Tippah County at EF3 strength as it destroyed several homes and a metal warehouse building near Walnut. The tornado maintained EF3 intensity crossed the state line into Tennessee, entering Hardeman County and passing near Middleton, damaging several homes in the area. Continuing into McNairy County, the tornado destroyed several additional homes at the south edge of Selmer before dissipating. Overall, 9 people were killed along the path and 36 others were injured.

See also
 December 2015 North American storm complex
 Tornado outbreak of December 16–17, 2019
 Tornado outbreak of December 10–11, 2021

Notes

References

F4 tornadoes by date
 ,2015-12-23
12,23
Tornado outbreak,12,23
Tornado outbreak,12,23
Tornado outbreak,12,23
Tornado outbreak,12,23
Tornado outbreak